Maria Margarethe Danzi ( Marchand; 1768 – 11 June 1800) was a German composer and soprano.

Maria Margarethe Marchand was born in Germany. Some sources give her birthplace as Munich and others Mannheim, and it was possible that the family was on tour in Frankfurt on the date of her birth. She was the daughter of the singer, actress and dancer Magdalena Brochard Marchand and Theobald Hilary Marchand, director of the National Theatre of Mannheim. 

Margarethe studied music and composition in Munich with Franziska Lebrun and in Salzburg with Leopold Mozart. She apprenticed in supporting roles and debuted in 1787 at the age of 12 at the Mannheim Court Theater, performing the title role in 'The Youth' by Johann Jakob Engel.

In 1790, she married conductor and composer Franz Danzi, and performed with him as prima donna of the troupe Domenico Guardasonis on European concert tours. After 1796, Margaret also performed as prima donna at the Munich Court Theatre. She died in Munich of pulmonary disease.

Works

List of works 
Six Sonatas for Keyboard (ca. 1786) — lost (Leopold Mozart unsuccessfully tried to make Torricella publish these sonatas)
Three sonatas for pianoforte with violin obbligato, Op. 1 (E-flat, B-flat, E), published by Falter (1801)
Marche de Marseillois varié for piano, Op. 2, published by Falter (1802)
Variations for piano (Andante from Franz Danzi's Piano Sonata in F, Op. 3 — published by Falter, ca. 1800)

Modern editions 
 Margarethe Danzi. Sonate für Violine und Klavier; op. 1,1. Hrsg. und Vorw. von Robert Münster. — Giebing: Katzbichler, [1967]. — 21 S. + 1 St. — (Varie musiche di Baviera).
 Margarethe Danzi. Sonata I in E-flat Major for violin and piano. Ed. by Barbara Harbach. — Pullman, WA: Vivace Pr. (VIV 905), c 1996. — 28 S. + 1 St.
 Margarethe Danzi. Sonata II in B-flat Major for violin and piano. Ed. by Barbara Harbach. — Pullman, WA: Vivace Pr. (VIV 906), c 1996. — 20 S. + 1 St.
 Margarethe Danzi. Sonata III in E Major for violin and piano. [Ed. by Barbara Harbach.] — Pullman, WA: Vivace Pr. (VIV 907), c 1996. — 25 S. + 1 St.
 Three Marias: three eighteenth century sonatas by Maria Barthélemon [No. 4], Maria Danzi [Op. 1 No. 1], Maria Hester Park [Op. 13 No. 2]. Ed. Susau [sic] Eileen Pickett. — Bryn Mawr, PA: Hildegard Publ. (09763), 1997. — VII, 51 S. + 1 St.
 Maria Margarethe Marchand Danzi. Sonata terza pour le pianoforte (with violin obbligato). [Ed. Caroline Cunningham]. — Bryn Mawr, PA: Hildegard Publ., 1998. — [28] S. + 1 St.

Sources 
Carl Cannabich. Obituary for Margarethe Danzi in: Allgemeine Musikalische Zeitung, november 1801.

References

External links
 

1768 births
1800 deaths
German Classical-period composers
Women classical composers
18th-century classical composers
18th-century German composers
19th-century women composers
18th-century women composers